Vitaly Petrovich Gerasimov (born 9 July 1977) is a Russian Ground Forces major general (one-star rank), the chief of staff and first deputy commander of the 41st Combined Arms Army.  

On 7 March Ukraine's Ministry of Defence announced that Gerasimov was killed in Kharkiv Oblast during the 2022 Russian invasion of Ukraine, but Gerasimov was confirmed to be alive by BBC Russian when he was awarded the Order of Alexander Nevsky on 23 May.

Early life and education 
Vitaly Petrovich Gerasimov was born on 9 July 1977 in Kazan. Gerasimov graduated from the Kazan Higher Tank Command School in 1999 and from the Combined Arms Academy of the Armed Forces of the Russian Federation in 2007.

Military career 
Gerasimov fought in the Second Chechen War (19992000). From 2007 to 2010, he commanded a motor-rifle battalion in the North Caucasus Military District. In October 2013, as a colonel, he was assigned as commander of the 15th Separate Motor Rifle Brigade (Peacekeeping).

He was awarded campaign medals for participating in the Russian annexation of Crimea in 2014, and the Russian military operation in Syria (from 2015).  In June 2016, he was promoted to the rank of major-general.

Gerasimov was claimed by Ukrainian authorities to have been killed during the 2022 Russian invasion of Ukraine on 7 March 2022 near Kharkiv, along with several other senior Russian officials. This was not confirmed by CNN or US officials. The Netherlands-based open-source intelligence (OSINT) fact-checking group Bellingcat said it had confirmed the death by accessing a Ukrainian intercept of Russian communications, as well as by means of "a Russian source". The Guardian newspaper reported on 8 March that the Ukrainian defence department "broadcast what it claimed was a conversation between two Russian FSB officers discussing the death and complaining that their secure communications were no longer functioning inside Ukraine". Gerasimov was confirmed to be in fact alive when he was awarded the Order of Alexander Nevsky on 23 May.

See also 
 List of Russian generals killed during the 2022 invasion of Ukraine

References

External links
 News of Gerasimov's promotion to major-general in September 2019 from the Russian Ministry of Defence's monthly magazine Российское военное обозрение (Russian Military Review), via the  Wayback Machine

1977 births
Living people
Military personnel from Kazan
Russian major generals
Russian colonels
People of the Chechen wars
Russian military personnel of the Syrian civil war
Russian military personnel of the Russo-Ukrainian War
People of the annexation of Crimea by the Russian Federation
Russian military personnel of the 2022 Russian invasion of Ukraine
Battle of Kharkiv (2022)
Eastern Ukraine offensive
Military Academy of the General Staff of the Armed Forces of Russia alumni
Recipients of the Order of Courage
Recipients of the Order of Military Merit (Russia)
Recipients of the Medal of the Order "For Merit to the Fatherland" II class
Recipients of the Order "For Merit to the Fatherland", 4th class
Recipients of the Order of Alexander Nevsky
20th-century Russian military personnel
21st-century Russian military personnel